Jon Michael Hill (born 28 July 1985) is an American actor. He is best known for his roles as Detective Marcus Bell in the CBS series Elementary (2012–2019) and Detective Damon Washington in the ABC series Detroit 1-8-7 (2010–2011).

Life and career
Hill was born in Waukegan, Illinois. During his high school years, he played football and the saxophone before focusing on pursuing an acting career, attending a summer drama program at Northwestern University. He graduated from the University of Illinois with a Bachelor of Fine Arts degree. While at the university, he appeared in stage productions of King Lear, Six Degrees of Separation and Ain't Misbehavin'.

In 2009, Hill was nominated for the Joseph Jefferson Award for Actor in a Supporting Role in a Play for "The Tempest" at the Steppenwolf Theatre Company in Chicago, Illinois.

In 2010, Hill was nominated for a Tony Award as Best Featured Actor in a Play in Superior Donuts opposite Michael McKean. In the same year, he began his role as Detective Damon Washington in the ABC police drama Detroit 1-8-7. He also played the role of Puck in the Shakespeare in the Park production of A Midsummer Night's Dream.

His other television credits include Law & Order: Special Victims Unit, Person of Interest, and Eastbound & Down. He then went on to star in the CBS series Elementary, wherein he played the role of Detective Marcus Bell. In 2018, he made his directorial debut with the Elementary episode "The Worms Crawl In, the Worms Crawl Out".

Filmography

Film

Television

References

External links

21st-century American male actors
Male actors from Illinois
African-American male actors
American male film actors
American male stage actors
American male television actors
Living people
Actors from Waukegan, Illinois
University of Illinois alumni
1985 births
Steppenwolf Theatre Company players
Theatre World Award winners
21st-century African-American people
20th-century African-American people